Harbor Lights is a studio album by American Christian and country music singer Cristy Lane. It was released in 1985 via LS Records. The original album contained a total of 14 tracks featuring a mixture of country and traditional pop music standards. It was Lane's twelfth studio recording in her career.

Background
During the late 1970s and early 1980s, Cristy Lane had commercial country music success with the top ten songs "Let Me Down Easy" and "I Just Can't Stay Married to You". In 1980, she reached her commercial zenith with the number one single, "One Day at a Time". The Christian track pointed Lane's career in a new direction and it became the subject of an autobiography, as well as several gospel recordings. Lane had been signed to Liberty Records (along with still remaining with the independent LS label), but left her contract in the mid 1980s.

Content and release
Harbor Lights contained 14 covers of traditional pop music standards such as "Allegheny Moon", "Que Sera, Sera" and "Love Letters in the Sand". Two new recordings were added as well. Both songs were originally composed by Lane herself. The album was co-produced by Lane's husband, Lee Stoller. Kenneth Christensen also contributed to the record's production. The project was first released in 1985 via LS Records as a vinyl LP. 

A cassette version with an identical track listing was also released in 1985. It was re-issued on Arrival Records in 1986 with the same track listing.

Track listing

Release history

References

1985 albums
Cristy Lane albums
LS Records albums